Nikolay Ivanovich Gapich (1901–1964) was a Soviet military leader, Major General of the Signal Corps (June 4, 1940). Head of the Communications Department of the Workers' and Peasants' Red Army (1940–1941), repressed in 1941, released and rehabilitated in 1953.

Early life and Civil War
Born on May 9, 1901, in the village of Novaya Alekseevka, Blagoveshchensky District, Amur Region, into a Russian peasant family. In 1916, he graduated from a two–year railway school, was educated as a telegraph operator. Then he worked on the railway as a telegraph operator–overseer.

In 1918 – Yerofey Pavlovich station commissar. In the autumn of the same year, he was arrested by the White Guards. Then he was forcibly mobilized as a private in the army of Alexander Kolchak.

After the defeat of the Siberian Army, on February 4, 1920, he voluntarily joined the Red Army. Participant of hostilities in Siberia: weapons instructor of a rifle regiment, from February 15 – adjutant of the head of communications of the Trans–Baikal front and rear, from May 23 – head of communications of the railway department of the Eastern Transbaikalian Front.

In June 1920, he was sent to the Southwestern Front, where he was appointed chief of communications for the front's railway sector, then company commander of the 8th Infantry Division.

From June 1921, he again fought in Siberia with the troops of the Far Eastern Republic against the Japanese interventionists, participated in the suppression of the West Siberian uprising: in June – commander of a communications company, then commander of a telegraph platoon of this company and assistant commander of a communications division; from August – Assistant to the Chief of Communications of the 3rd Amur Rifle Division; from September – Chief of Communications of the Special Amur Rifle Regiment; since October – assistant and temporary acting commander of the telegraph company of the headquarters of the Commander–in–Chief of Siberia Vasily Shorin; from November – assistant commander of the 1st Separate Telegraph–Construction Company.

Interwar period
After the end of hostilities, he continued to serve in the Far East. From April 1922 – head of the communications team of the 2nd Separate Rifle Battalion of the border troops. From August 1922 – platoon commander of the 1st Communications Company. Then he served in the newly formed 1st Trans–Baikal Infantry Division: from September 1922 – assistant regiment commander for the technical part, and from November 1923 – assistant to the division's communications chief. From May 1924 – the head of the communications team of the 1st Chita Rifle Regiment, and from November of the same year – the commander of the communications platoon of the same regiment. Then he studied at the Vladivostok infantry school, after which in November 1925, he was appointed commander of a separate communications company of the 1st Rifle Division.

On October 1, 1927, he was enrolled as a student at the main faculty of the Mikhail Frunze Military Academy, from which he graduated on May 1, 1930, and in the same month was appointed chief of staff of the 9th Communications Regiment in the Belorussian Military District. From January 1931, he served as assistant chief of communications of the Belorussian Military District, and in April he was approved in this position. From December 30, 1932, to February 22, 1936 – Chief of the Signal Corps of the Belorussian Military District.

From October 1936 – student of the Academy of the General Staff of the Workers' and Peasants' Red Army. In June 1938, he graduated from the Academy, and was left there as a teacher in the Department of Operational Art; from April 1940 – senior lecturer of the same department. Here Gapich prepared several textbooks on the communications service, scientific works and received the title of associate professor of the Academy.

On July 26, 1940, he was appointed head of the Communications Department of the Workers' and Peasants' Red Army. Having familiarized himself with the state of affairs in the Directorate, he came to the conclusion that there was a huge shortage of communications equipment in the troops. From October 1940 to June 1941, he repeatedly addressed reports on the need to urgently rectify matters to People's Commissar of Defense Semyon Timoshenko, Chiefs of the General Staff Kirill Meretskov and Georgy Zhukov, Chairman of the Defense Committee under the Council of People's Commissars of the Soviet Union Kliment Voroshilov, but the measures he proposed did not have been implemented. As a result, from the first days of the Great Patriotic War, the lack of proper communication at all levels of troops became one of the important reasons for losses in command and control of troops and military defeats.

Great Patriotic War, arrest, repression
Dismissed from office on July 22, 1941. According to the memoirs of the future Marshal of the Signal Corps Ivan Peresypkin, this happened during the report of Nikolai Gapich to Joseph Stalin on the state of communications in the troops. A few days later, he was appointed Chief of Communications of the Front of the Reserve Armies, arrived at the front, but did not manage to take office. The front was reorganized into the Reserve Front, and the new front commander, Georgy Zhukov, who arrived, appointed General Ivan Bulychev as the front commander, and Nikolai Gapich as his deputy. Arrested on August 6, 1941.

He was under investigation for a long time. At first, he was accused of criminal leadership in the work of his administration, that he did not supply the army with the required amount of communication means, in the war with Germany he did not meet the needs of the front and was unable to establish uninterrupted communication with the fronts. Then added the accusation of participation in a "military–fascist conspiracy". After using physical pressure, he slandered himself and admitted that since 1935 he was a member of an anti-Soviet organization in the Belarusian Military District and headed by Ieronim Uborevich. Even later, accusations were added of working for Japanese intelligence during the Civil War. Then Nikolay Gapich retracted all confessions. In view of the complete absurdity, the charges of conspiracy and espionage were dropped from him. By order of the People's Commissariat of Defense of the Soviet Union on January 29, 1944, he was dismissed from the Red Army.

After 11 years of being under investigation in prison, on August 26, 1952, by the Military Collegium of the Supreme Court of the Soviet Union, under Article 193, paragraph 17, was sentenced to 10 years in a correctional labour camp. By the decree of the Council of Ministers of the Soviet Union of October 2, 1952, he was deprived of the military rank "Major General". To serve his sentence, he was sent to the city of Nizhneudinsk, Irkutsk Oblast, where he worked as a foreman in felling.

Released in July 1953. Rehabilitated on July 28, 1953. On August 15 of the same year, the Council of Ministers of the Soviet Union canceled its decision to deprive Nikolay Gapich of his military rank, and he was reinstated in the Soviet Army. After being at the disposal of the Main Personnel Directorate of the Ministry of the Armed Forces of the Soviet Union, he was transferred to the reserve on October 21, 1953, for health reasons. He lived in Moscow, worked in the apparatus of the Ministry of Communications of the Soviet Union since 1956 as the head of the inspection, since 1961 – as the head of the 1st Department.

He was buried at the Golovinskoye Cemetery in Moscow.

Military ranks
Colonel (January 29, 1936);
Brigade Commander (April 2, 1940);
Major general (June 4, 1940).

Awards
Order of Lenin (1953);
Order of the Red Banner (1941);
Medal "For the Victory over Germany in the Great Patriotic War 1941–1945"

References

Sources
Command and Control Personnel of the Red Army in 1940–1941: Structure and Personnel of the Central Apparatus of the People's Commissariat of Defense of the Soviet Union, Military Districts and Combined–Arms Armies: Documents and Materials / Edited by Vladimir Kuzelenkov – Moscow–Saint Petersburg: Summer Garden, 2005 – Page 128 – 1000 Copies – 
Nikolay Cherushev, Yuri Cherushev. The Executed Elite of the Workers' and Peasants' Red Army (Commanders of the 1st and 2nd Ranks, Corps Commanders, Division Commanders and Their Peers): 1937–1941. Biographical Dictionary – Moscow: Kuchkovo Field; Megapolis, 2012 – Pages 447–448 – 496 Pages – 2000 Copies – 
Denis Soloviev. All of Stalin's Generals. Volume 3 – Moscow, 2019 –  – Pages 41–42

External links
Biographical Information About Nikolay Gapich  on the Website of the Siberian State University of Telecommunications and Informatics
Biography of Nikolay Gapich on the Website of the Ulyanovsk Military School of Communications
Biography on the Site "The Shot Generation. 1937 and Other Years"

1901 births
1964 deaths
Soviet major generals
Recipients of the Order of Lenin
Recipients of the Order of the Red Banner
Soviet military personnel of the Russian Civil War
Frunze Military Academy alumni
Military Academy of the General Staff of the Armed Forces of the Soviet Union alumni
Soviet rehabilitations
Textbook writers
Communist Party of the Soviet Union members